Alopecosa huabanna is a species of wolf spider found in Inner Mongolia in the People's Republic of China. The female has a length (excluding legs) of about 10 mm, the male being smaller at around 8 mm. Both sexes are generally dark brown with a longitudinal yellow band along the back of the carapace and abdomen, which distinctively has 4 paired branches towards the back of the abdomen. The male has much hairier legs than the female.

It is similar to Alopecosa ovalis and several other species.

References 

  (2000): Two new species of the genus Alopecosa Simon (Araneae: Lycosidae) from Inner Mongolia, China. Zoological Studies 39(2): 133-137. PDF

huabanna
Fauna of Inner Mongolia
Spiders of China
Spiders described in 2000